Ronald Henry Fox  (23 January 1880 – 27 August 1952) was a New Zealand cricketer and British army officer.

Ronald Fox was born in Dunedin. His father worked for the Bank of New Zealand in the nearby town of Milton. After attending Haileybury and Imperial Service College in England from 1893 to 1898, he played club cricket in England, usually as a wicketkeeper, including a few games for Kent Second XI. He had played only four first-class matches for various teams between 1904 and 1906 when he was selected in the Marylebone Cricket Club side that toured New Zealand in 1906–07.

Fox played 10 of the 11 first-class matches on the tour, including the two unofficial Tests  against New Zealand at the end of the tour. He made his highest first-class score in the second match against Otago, when he made 54 and put on 134 for the opening partnership with Peter Randall Johnson.

He continued to play for MCC in England until the First World War. He served as a captain in the Royal Field Artillery from 1914 to 1919. He was awarded the Military Cross and was mentioned in despatches.

In 1927, when the New Zealand cricket team were touring England for the first time, they invited him to play in one of their first-class matches. Aged 47, and 17 years after his previous first-class match, he opened the batting and made 4. The New Zealanders nevertheless beat the Civil Service cricket team, who were playing what turned out to be their only first-class match, by an innings.

References

External links
 
 

1880 births
1952 deaths
People educated at Haileybury and Imperial Service College
New Zealand cricketers
Pre-1930 New Zealand representative cricketers
Marylebone Cricket Club cricketers
Gentlemen of England cricketers
Cricketers from Dunedin
New Zealand recipients of the Military Cross
Royal Field Artillery officers
H. D. G. Leveson Gower's XI cricketers
British Army personnel of World War I